Clark International Airport station is an under-construction railway station located on the North–South Commuter Railway in Pampanga, Philippines.

The station will host the first direct airport rail link in the country.

History 
A rail link from Clark International Airport to the capital was originally planned in the 1990s. The first proposal, called the "Manila–Clark rapid railway system", was discontinued due to disagreement on funding. In the early 2000s, the Northrail project was pursued. This involved the conversion the rail gauge from narrow gauge to standard gauge, and linking Manila to Malolos, Bulacan and eventually to Clark and the airport. While the project commenced in 2007, it was repeatedly halted due to allegations of overpricing, then discontinued in 2011.

Design
The station is being constructed as part of the second phase of the North–South Commuter Railway.

Clark spur
The station will be built at the end of the Clark spur line of the NSCR North, while the mainline will lead to the future New Clark City station in Capas, Tarlac. Without a railway wye to link the station with New Clark City, there are no direct segments linking the two sections.

It will begin as an approximately  quadruple-track segment of the mainline before splitting near the SCTEX–NLEX Interchange Road. From there, it will continue as an elevated line for at least  before approaching an at-grade section in which the two depot tracks for the Mabalacat rail yard will meet the branch line. The Clark Airport-bound section will transition from at-grade to depressed before approaching a Y-junction with one of the depot tracks. At this point, the rest of the line will be underground until it reaches the station. According to detailed design documents, the maximum speed for this section is at  due to a tighter curve radius.

Station building
The station will be located underground. It will have two island platforms and quadruple tracks, stemming at a section of the line underneath a roundabout for roads at ground-level. Allowances for a future transport hub have already been allotted and a parking lot is located atop the station.

References

Philippine National Railways stations
Railway stations in Pampanga
Proposed railway stations in the Philippines
Airport railway stations